Henley & Grange is a baseball club playing in the South Australian Baseball League. The team was established in 1945. As of 2009, Henley & Grange are in Division 1 of Australian baseball.

External links
 Official Site

Australian baseball clubs
Sporting clubs in Adelaide
Baseball teams established in 1946
1946 establishments in Australia